, son of Nijō Harutaka, was a kuge or Japanese court noble of the Edo period (1603–1868). He was adopted by his brother Suketsugu as his son. He held a regent position kampaku from 1856 to 1862, and retired in 1863, becoming a buddhist monk.

Family
 Father: Nijō Harutaka
 Mother: Higuchi Nobuko
 Wife: Karahashi Meiko (1796–1881)
 Concubine: unknown
 Children:
 Empress Dowager Eishō by Meiko
 Kujō Michitaka by Meiko
 Matsuzono Hisayoshi by Concubine
 Tsurudono Tadayoshi (1853–1895) by Concubine
 Takatsukasa Hiromichi by Concubine
 Nijō Motohiro by Concubine
 Adopted son: Kujō Yukitsune (1823–1859) adopted by Meiko

Ancestry

Title

References

 

1798 births
1871 deaths
Fujiwara clan
Kujō family
Nijō family
Japanese priests
Regents of Japan